Kazimierz R. Czarnecki (1916 – 30 January 2005) was a Polish aeronautics engineer who worked for NACA, later NASA.

Kazimierz Czarnecki immigrated to the United States in an unknown year. He graduated in 1939 from the University of Alabama. He started working with NACA that same year and remained through the renaming to NASA until his retirement in 1978 from a position as Senior Aeronautical Research Engineer.
In the 2016 film Hidden Figures, Karl Zielinski was a fictionalized version of Czarnecki featured as a wind tunnel expert. He published many papers together with Mary W. Jackson, serving as her long-time mentor. In 1979, Jackson organized his retirement party.

Publications

References

External links
 NASA Technical Reports Server (NTRS): Czarnecki, K R

Polish aerospace engineers
1916 births
2005 deaths
University of Alabama alumni
NASA people
Langley Research Center
Polish emigrants to the United States